The 2017–18 Gibraltar Premier Division was the 119th season of the top-tier national football league in Gibraltar, as well as the fifth season since the Gibraltar Football Association joined UEFA in 2013. The league was contested by ten clubs. It began on 26 September 2017 and ended on 3 June 2018.

Europa were the defending champions, having ended a fourteen-year winning streak for Lincoln Red Imps. This season also saw three clubs from Gibraltar competing in European competition for the first time. Lincoln won their 23rd title on 19 May 2018 with two games to spare, after a 7–1 victory over Lions Gibraltar.

Format
The ten Premier Division clubs played each other three times for a total of 27 matches each. The tenth-placed team in the league would be relegated and the ninth-placed team in the league would enter a playoff with the second-placed team from the Second Division for a place in the 2018–19 Premier Division.

The champions earned a place in the preliminary round of the 2018–19 Champions League, and the second–placed club earned a place in the preliminary round of the 2018–19 Europa League. This season, the league entered a winter break from December to February while renovations took place on Victoria Stadium.

Teams

At the conclusion of the previous season, Europa Point was relegated. As the champions of the Second Division, Gibraltar Phoenix earned promotion to the league this season. Manchester 62 earned the right to stay in the Premier Division by winning a playoff at the end of the previous season.

Personnel and kits

Note: Flags indicate national team as has been defined under FIFA eligibility rules. Players may hold more than one non-FIFA nationality.

Managerial Changes

League table

Results

Matches 1–18

Matches 19–27

Promotion/relegation play-off
The ninth-placed team from the Premier Division played a play-off match with the second-placed Second Division club for a place in the 2018–19 Premier Division.

Season statistics

Scoring

Top scorers

Hat-tricks

Clean sheets

See also
2017–18 Gibraltar Second Division

References

External links
soccerway
Gibraltar Football Association

Gibraltar Premier Division seasons
Gib
1